Liu Chao may refer to:

 Six Dynasties, a collective noun for six Chinese dynasties
 Liu Chao (footballer), Chinese footballer